Associations Incorporation Act 1981 may refer to:

 Associations Incorporation Act 1981 (Queensland)
 Associations Incorporation Act 1981 (Victoria)